Stadiochilus is a genus of plants in the ginger family. It contains only one known species, Stadiochilus burmanicus, first described by Rosemary Margaret Smith in 1980 and endemic to Myanmar (Burma).

References

Endemic flora of Myanmar
Zingiberoideae
Zingiberaceae genera
Monotypic Zingiberales genera